Thomas Mayne Daly (February 17, 1827 – March 4, 1885) was a businessman and political figure in Canada West (later Ontario). He represented the riding of Perth North in the House of Commons of Canada and Perth North in the Ontario Provincial Parliament.

He was born in Hamilton, Upper Canada in 1827 and studied at Upper Canada College. He ran a stage coach company, operated a grain mill and published the Stratford Examiner. He was a contractor, building roads in Perth County and also railroads in Canada and the United States. From 1848 to 1849, he served on the Huron District council and, in 1850, on the council for the united counties of Huron, Perth and Bruce.

In 1854, he was elected to the 5th Parliament of the Province of Canada representing Perth County; he originally described himself as an independent Reformer, but tended to support the Liberal-Conservative party once elected. He was reelected in 1857 but was defeated by Michael Hamilton Foley in 1861. Foley was appointed to the cabinet and ran in Waterloo North; Daly defeated Robert MacFarlane in an 1862 by-election to regain the seat for Perth. However, in 1863, McFarlane won the seat.

Daly was mayor of Stratford from 1869 to 1870 and again from 1876 to 1878. In 1872, he was elected to the House of Commons for Perth North. He was elected for Perth North provincially in an 1874 by-election, but was not reelected in 1875. In 1884, he was appointed deputy collector of customs at Stratford, thanks to his connections with the Conservative Party. He died in Stratford in 1885.

His son, Thomas Mayne Daly, was a member of parliament and cabinet minister from Manitoba.

External links
 
 
 

1827 births
1885 deaths
Members of the Legislative Assembly of the Province of Canada from Canada West
Members of the House of Commons of Canada from Ontario
Progressive Conservative Party of Ontario MPPs
Conservative Party of Canada (1867–1942) MPs
Mayors of Stratford, Ontario
Politicians from Hamilton, Ontario